Pomacea auriformis is a species of freshwater snail in the family Ampullariidae, described by Lovell Augustus Reeve in 1856 as Ampullaria auriformis. Its distribution is along the Caribbean coast of Central America. There has been debate over whether this species may be a subspecies of Ampullaria hopetonensis.

References 

auriformis
Freshwater snails
Molluscs of Central America
Gastropods described in 1856